The West Fork Millicoma River is a tributary, about  long, of the Millicoma River in the U.S. state of Oregon. Rising in northeastern Coos County near the Douglas County line, it flows generally southwest through the Elliott State Forest of the Southern Oregon Coast Range to the community of Allegany. There it joins the East Fork Millicoma River to form the Millicoma.

Course
Over the next , Panther Creek enters from the left, Fish Creek from the right, Elk Creek from the left, and Knife, Deer, and Otter creeks from the right. The river turns south, and Joes Creek enters from the right at about river mile (RM) 24.5 or river kilometer (RK) 39.4. About  further downstream, Buck Creek enters from the right. The next named tributary to enter the river is Trout Creek, which comes in from the right at about RM 19 (RK 31).

About  from the mouth, the river turns west and a mile later descends Stulls Falls and turns south once more. Turning west near RM 14 (RK 23), the river goes over Henrys Falls, meandering generally south-southwest thereafter. The river then flows by a stream gauge maintained by the Coos Watershed Association. Turning south once again, the river flows around Devils Elbow and receives Rainy Creek from the left before meeting the East Fork Millicoma River at Allegany. The West Fork Millicoma Road runs roughly parallel to the river from Allegany to Stalls Falls, and logging roads reach the headwaters.

Recreation
The river supports a steelhead fishery as well as good coastal cutthroat trout fishing near the headwaters. However, the hatchery site itself offers bank access. The site also includes an interpretive center that is open to the public.

Obstacles like the falls, a  drop, are generally scouted before running and often portaged.

See also
List of rivers of Oregon

References

Works cited
Giordano, Pete (2004). Soggy Sneakers: A Paddler's Guide to Oregon's Rivers, 4th ed. Seattle: The Mountaineers Books. .
McArthur, Lewis A., and McArthur, Lewis L. (2003) [1928]. Oregon Geographic Names, 7th ed. Portland: Oregon Historical Society Press. .
Sheehan, Madelynne Diness (2005). Fishing in Oregon: The Complete Oregon Fishing Guide, 10th ed. Scappoose, Oregon: Flying Pencil Publications. .

External links
Coos Watershed Association

Rivers of Oregon
Rivers of Coos County, Oregon